Fastiv Raion is a raion (district) in Kyiv Oblast of Ukraine. Its administrative center is the city of Fastiv. Population: .

On 18 July 2020, as part of the administrative reform of Ukraine, the number of raions of Kyiv Oblast was reduced to seven, and the area of Fastiv Raion was significantly expanded.  The January 2020 estimate of the raion population was

Subdivisions

Current
After the reform in July 2020, the raion consisted of 10 hromadas:
 Boiarka urban hromada with the administration in the city of Boiarka, transferred from Kyiv-Sviatoshyn Raion;
 Byshiv rural hromada  with the administration in the selo of Byshiv, transferred from Makariv Raion; 
 Chabany settlement hromada with the administration in the urban-type settlement of Chabany, transferred from Kyiv-Sviatoshyn Raion;
 Fastiv urban hromada with the administration in the city of Fastiv, transferred from the city of oblast significance of Fastiv; 
 Hatne rural hromada with the administration in the selo of Hatne, transferred from Kyiv-Sviatoshyn Raion;
 Hlevakha settlement hromada with the administration in the urban-type settlement of Hlevakha, transferred from Vasylkiv Raion; 
 Kalynivka settlement hromada with the administration in the urban-type settlement of Kalynivka, transferred from Vasylkiv Raion;
 Kozhanka settlement hromada with the administration in the urban-type settlement of Kozhanka, retained from Fastiv Raion;
 Tomashivka rural hromada with the administration in the selo of Tomashivka, retained from Fastiv Raion.

Before 2020

Before the 2020 reform, the raion consisted of two hromadas, 
 Kozhanka settlement hromada with the administration in Kozhanka;
 Tomashivka rural hromada with the administration in Tomashivka.

References

Raions of Kyiv Oblast
 
1923 establishments in Ukraine